William Anthony Chadwick (born 19 January 2000) is an English professional footballer who plays as a forward for Boston United on loan from Hull City.

Professional career
A youth product of Hull City since he was 11, Chadwick joined Gainsborough Trinity on loan in 2019. He made his professional debut with Hull City in a 1–1 (8–9) EFL Cup penalty shootout win over Leeds on 16 September 2020. 

On 27 November 2020, Chadwick signed a new one-and-a-half-year deal with the club.

On 19 December 2020, Chadwick joined FC Halifax Town on a month-long loan. He went straight into the FA Trophy match against Hartlepool United, scoring his first goal in the 3–3 draw and converted a penalty to put Halifax through 4–2 on penalties. On 14 January 2021, Chadwick was recalled from the loan by his parent club Hull City. On 5 March 2021, he returned to FC Halifax Town for a month-long loan spell. On 29 March 2021, the loan was extended for the remainder of the season.

On 9 July 2021, Chadwick joined Linfield on loan until January 2022 and on 3 August scored against CS Fola Esch in the third round of the qualifying stages for the UEFA Europa Conference League. But on 24 November, he returned from his loan spell at Linfield because of an anterior cruciate ligament knee injury.

On 5 January 2023, Chadwick joined Boston United on a month-long loan spell, which was extended for a further month on 2 February 2023 and on 6 March 2023 extended for the rest of the season.

Career statistics

Notes

References

External links
 
 Soccerbase Profile
 Hull City Tigers Profile

2000 births
Living people
Footballers from Kingston upon Hull
English footballers
Association football midfielders
Hull City A.F.C. players
Gainsborough Trinity F.C. players
FC Halifax Town players
Linfield F.C. players
Boston United F.C. players